Swiss Education Group (SEG) AG is a private company that operates four hospitality schools—Culinary Arts Academy Switzerland, Hotel Institute Montreux, Swiss Hotel Management School, and César Ritz Colleges Switzerland. Its schools operate across six campuses all based in Switzerland, with a student base of more than 6,000 enrolled students from around the world. Its schools have more than 24,000 alumni representing 110 nationalities.  

Chief Executive Officer Leo Wang joined Swiss Education Group in 2022.

History 
Swiss Education Group was founded in 1986 and was originally called the Swiss Language Club (SLC) before being renamed to Swiss Education Academy. At the time, they hosted summer camps for young people ages 7-18 years old from around the world. 

In 1992, Swiss Hotel Management School was established as the first school under the umbrella of Swiss Education Group.

Hotel Institute Montreux (founded in 1985) was acquired by Swiss Education Group in 2002 and International Hotel and Tourism Training Institute (founded in 1984) also joined Swiss Education Group in 2004. That same year, Swiss Hotel Management School opened their Leysin campus after acquiring the Mont Blanc and Belvédère hotels. 

César Ritz Colleges Switzerland (founded in 1982) and Culinary Arts Academy Switzerland (formally known as DCT European Culinary Arts) joined the education group in 2011. 

In 2017, Swiss Education Group launched their SEGPro program designed to offer professional courses in hospitality, culinary arts, and leadership. 

Swiss Education Group’s holding company—Swiss Education Group Holding AG—sold the education network to the Hong Kong-based investment management company, Summer Capital, in 2018.

In 2021, International Hotel and Tourism Training Institute merged with Swiss Hotel Management School.

Schools 
Swiss Education Group consists of four hospitality schools across five campuses in the French-speaking regions of Switzerland. Programs are presented in English and attract students from more than 110 countries. All four schools that belong to the Swiss Education Group portfolio have been ranked amongst the top ten in the world by the QS Rankings.

César Ritz Colleges Switzerland 
César Ritz Colleges Switzerland is a hospitality school with campuses in Le Bouveret and Brig, Switzerland. It is inspired by Swiss hotelier and hospitality leader César Ritz—founder of the Hôtel Ritz in Paris and the Ritz and Carlton Hotels in London and ranked seventh in the QS World University Rankings for Hospitality & Leisure Management.

Programs 
César Ritz Colleges Switzerland offers bachelor's and master's degree programs, as well as a Certificate in Wine Business Management. The degree programs are accredited in partnership with Washington State University and the University of Derby.

Campuses 
The school is situated across three campuses, shared with Culinary Arts Academy Switzerland, in Le Bouveret and Brig, Switzerland.

Culinary Arts Academy Switzerland 
Culinary Arts Academy Switzerland was founded in 1991. Culinary Arts Academy shares campuses in Brig, Lucerne, and Le Bouveret with César Ritz Colleges Switzerland.

Programs 
Culinary Arts Academy offers bachelor's and master's degrees programs and specialized diploma programs in Culinary Arts, Vegetarian Culinary Arts, and Pastry & Chocolate arts. Programs are accredited in partnership with the University of Derby (UK).

Campuses 
The school is situated across three campuses, shared with César Ritz Colleges Switzerland in Le Bouveret and Brig Switzerland. The campus in Le Bouveret is home to the Apicius Culinary Training Center.

Hotel Institute Montreux 
Hotel Institute Montreux (HIM) is a hospitality school with a specializations in Financial Analysis & Wealth Management, Human Capital & Development, Management for the Senior Living Industry, Luxury Brand Management, and Franchise Business Management. It was founded in 1984 and is located on the shores of Lake Geneva in Montreux, Switzerland.   It was ranked sixth in the QS World University Rankings for Hospitality & Leisure Management.

Programs 
Hotel Institute Montreux offers a Bachelor’s in Business Administration.

Campuses 
The school is housed in three buildings on the shores of Lake Geneva in Montreux, Switzerland—Hotel Europe, Leman Residence, and The Freddie Mercury and provides accommodation and learning facilities.

Swiss Hotel Management School 
Swiss Hotel Management School (SHMS) specializes in the study of hospitality management. It was established in 1992 and is situated across two campuses in Caux and Leysin, Switzerland.  It was ranked third in the QS World University Rankings for Hospitality & Leisure Management in 2022.

Programs 
The school offers a variety of bachelor’s and master’s degree programs, postgraduate studies, and online degrees covering a range of specialities including: Hospitality Management, Design, Events, Luxury Brands, and Business Analytics. Programs are accredited in partnership with the University of Derby (UK).

Campuses 
SHMS is situated across two campuses in Caux and Leysin, Switzerland. Nicknamed the Sleeping Beauty Castle, SHMS's Caux Palace campus is a converted palace luxury hotel situated above Montreux, Switzerland. SHMS's Leysin campus is based in two former Belle Epoque hotels in the ski resort town of Leysin, Switzerland.

Accreditations & partnerships 
Partnerships include Dorchester Collection, Kempinski, and UBS Bank.

References 

Educational institutions established in 1986
Swiss companies established in 1986
Private education in Switzerland
Hospitality schools in Switzerland